Henrik Arnold Thaulow Bergh (24 April 1879 – 12 July 1952) was a  Norwegian lawyer and politician, born in Oslo, a barrister at the Supreme Court of Norway. He is known for his defence of Vidkun Quisling during the trial for treason in 1945.

References

Further reading

1879 births
1952 deaths
Lawyers from Oslo
Conservative Party (Norway) politicians